Run is a 2019–20 Tamil-language thriller drama series directed by K. Rajeev Prasad is a remake of Turkish Serial “Black Money love” on Sun TV. It stars Krishna and Sharanya Turadi (later replaced by Chaya Singh). It premiered on 5 August 2019 and ended on 31 March 2020 for 197 episodes due to corona pandemic.

Synopsis
Run is a thriller drama on Sun TV. The story is about Shakthi, faces enemies in his life.

Divya returns from her abroad education and takes up the rein of her father's nursing home. She adores her father and is devastated to find him in a financial crisis. Shakthi, an employee of an automobile company lives with his sister's family, who mean the world to him. He is engaged to Caroline, the love of his life. Unfortunately, Divya's father and Sakthi's fiancée go missing on the same day and later found dead. Watch how Divya and Shakthi's common motive and probe to unravel the mysterious deaths, bring their hearts closer. Divya, a hard-working and smart woman from a rich family, realises that her father is facing problems. A series of events leads her to Shakthi, who is straightforward and despises affluent people.

Cast

Main
 Krishna as Shakthivel
 Sharanya Turadi (2019) as Divya
 Chaya Singh (2019-2020) as Divya Shaktivel
 Vijjith as Rudramoorthy "Rudran" (Selvanayagam's henchman)(Main Antagonist)

Supporting
 Nizhalgal Ravi as Dr. Radhakrishnan "RK": Father of Shalini, Divya and Ramya.
 Pramodini Pammi as Gayathri Radhakrishnan: Mother of Shalini, Divya and Ramya
Ashwanth Thilak as Prabhu , Shakthi's Best Friend
 Rindhya as Shalini Sekhar: Elder sister of Divya and Ramya
 Mythili Raju → Vaishnavi  as Ramya Rudramoorthy: Younger sister of Shalini and Divya
 Shyam Sundar as Chandrasekhar "Sekhar": Shalini's Husband
 Sindhu Shyam as Meenakumari (Antagonist)
 Ashwin Karthik as Vikraman "Vikram" Senthilkumar: Meenakumari's brother-in-law (Antagonist)
Raj Kapoor as Selvanayagam: Gayathri's brother-in-law and Meenakumari's henchman
Sathyapriya as RK's aunt and Divya's grandmother
 Sri Durga as Lokeshwari Chandran aka Logu: Shakthi's elder sister
 Srikrishna Kaushik as Chandran: Shakthi's brother in law
 Navya Swamy as Caroline: Shakthi's lover (Deceased, killed by Vikram)
 Kurinji Nathan as Christopher: Caroline's elder brother
 Durga Deepthi as Nancy Christopher: Christopher's wife
 Babitha as Caroline's mother 
 Mithuna as Jessy: Caroline's younger sister
 Vijayachandrika as Meenakumari's mother
 Reena as Chandran's mother
 VJ Sasikala Nagarajan as Priya: Divya's colleague
 Rafi Ullah as Siju: Rudran's assistant
 Tharsika as Rohini: Shakthi and Prabhu's friend
 Vishwanathan as Prabhu's fake brother 
Archana VJ as Prabhu's fake sister 
 K. S. G. Venkatesh as Shakthi's Car company owner
 Yaar Kannan

Production
This Tamil drama is produced with a cinematic tone, making it different from other usual Tamil dramas. Some of the initial scenes were shot in Hong Kong. Besides some were also shot in Chennai, Alleppey and some parts of North India.

Initially, Vani Bhojan was chosen to play female leads but she declined. Later,
Sharanyaa Turadi Sundar Raj played Divya. In November 2019, Sundar Raj quit and was replaced by Chaya Singh.

International broadcast
The series was released on 5 August 2019 on Sun TV, also airs on Sun TV HD, and is broadcast internationally. 
 
Episodes are released on the YouTube channel Vikatan TV after their original telecast.

Adaptations

This series is dubbed into Telugu
as Run in ETV Telugu and started telecast from 5 April 2021.

References

Tamil-language television shows
2019 Tamil-language television series debuts
2010s Tamil-language television series
Tamil-language thriller television series
Tamil-language medical television series
Tamil-language romance television series
Sun TV original programming
2020 Tamil-language television series endings